Protests are being held in Montenegro against the dismissal of the Prime Minister, Zdravko Krivokapić, and the 42nd Cabinet of Montenegro, along with the possible formation of a temporary minority government. Since most ministers of the cabinet are close to Krivokapić, most ministers supported or attended these protests, including Vesna Bratić, Jakov Milatović and Milojko Spajić. The protests are being held in multiple cities such as Podgorica, Bijelo Polje and Berane. While most have been peaceful, there have been incidents of violence at the protests, such as the assault of a reporter of RTCG, the state media of Montenegro.

On 24 January, Vesna Bratić was accused by opposition parties of insulting national minorities due to comments she made about the leaders of parties that represent national minorities in Montenegro, as well as comments glorifying the Serbian Orthodox Church.

On 4 February, a vote of no confidence was held against the Krivokapić cabinet and it was dismissed.

On 7 February, President of the Parliament of Montenegro, Aleksa Bečić, was dismissed.

Background 
The protests started as a response to the proposition of the United Reform Action (URA) and some other parties and political leaders to dismiss the current government and Prime Minister. The reason for these propositions is that Krivokapić outright refused to dismiss some of his ministers, such as Bratić, after a majority of parliament voted to dismiss them because of “not doing their jobs correctly” or being outed as extremists. The protests were composed of mostly conservatives and supporters of the Serbian Orthodox Church which has a significant influence in the Krivokapić government, as most of the ministers are close to it.

Symbolism and slogans

Symbolism 
Unlike most of the protests in Montenegro in the last few years, these protests are mostly secular. However, a lot of Serbian Orthodox Church flags and symbolism can be seen at the protests, along with the Montenegrin tricolour, which was a partly official Flag of Montenegro from 1905 to 1918. The flag is today used as a symbol of Serb politics in Montenegro.
Along with historical flags, parody Euro bills were printed with figures such as Abazović, Joković and Đukanović on them.

Slogans 
Slogans used include chants like “Traitor!”, and sayings like “You took the money, Dritan!”, referring to a claim that Abazović took a bribe of €21,000,000, even though this claim turned out to be false.

izdaja.me 
An anonymous website was launched at https://izdaja.me that showed certain members of the Parliament of Montenegro that agreed to dismiss Krivokapić's government, with captions such as “Sold! Betrayal!”.

On 4 February, the host of izdaja.me went down, which was suspected to be related to the no confidence vote held against the government. As of 5 February, a Cloudflare Error 525 appears when visiting the site.

See also 

 Montenegrin nationalist protests (2020–present)
 2019–2020 clerical protests in Montenegro
 2022 Montenegrin crisis

References

2022 protests
2022 in Montenegro
Protests in Montenegro
Protest marches
Protests against results of elections